Briar Anne Nolet (born December 27, 1998) is a Canadian dancer and actress, known for her role as Richelle on the Family series The Next Step. In 2019, she competed on the third season of World of Dance.

Career
Nolet began dancing at the age of seven, and growing up, she competed in dance competitions around Canada. In 2014, she began portraying the role of Richelle on the Family Channel series The Next Step. As part of The Next Step franchise, Nolet has toured in Canada, Australia and the United Kingdom.

In 2017, Nolet auditioned for the first season of the NBC dance series World of Dance, but did not proceed any further. However, in 2019, Nolet competed in the third season of World of Dance. After finishing in fifth place, World of Dance judge Jennifer Lopez invited Nolet to perform on the It's My Party Tour. André Hereford described Nolet as a "death-dropping, back-flipping spitfire".

On March 18, 2022, her very own activewear line, Halo Braxton launched.  She wanted to make sure that people would, "meet their lifestyle needs while making them feel as gorgeous and powerful as they are"

Personal life
Nolet was in a relationship with The Next Step co-star Myles Erlick from the age of 16. The couple later split in 2022. She began dating Colin McLeod in 2022. While competing on World of Dance, Nolet revealed that she began having seizures at the age of 16. Nolet was initially misdiagnosed with anxiety, but after visiting a neurologist in Toronto, she was diagnosed with epilepsy at the age of 19.

Filmography

References

External links
 

1998 births
21st-century Canadian actresses
21st-century Canadian dancers
Actresses from Ontario
Canadian child actresses
Canadian female dancers
Canadian film actresses
Canadian television actresses
Living people
Participants in American reality television series
People from Oakville, Ontario
People with epilepsy